Winds of Change is the debut album by Eric Burdon & the Animals, released in October 1967.

Background 
The original band, the Animals, broke up in 1966 and this band was entirely new except for lead singer Eric Burdon and drummer Barry Jenkins, who joined the original lineup when John Steel left in February 1966. With the new band, featuring guitarist Vic Briggs, bassist Danny McCulloch, and electric violinist John Weider, Burdon began to move from the gritty blues sound of the original mid-1960s group into psychedelic music.

The album is the first to feature nearly entirely original material, written by Eric Burdon and band members, and involving equal songwriting credit.  This practice would continue with the following album, The Twain Shall Meet, and was then discontinued.

The album opens with the sound of waves washing over the title track, "Winds of Change". "Poem by the Sea" is a spoken-word piece by Burdon with a swirl of echo-drenched instruments. "Good Times" and "San Franciscan Nights" were two of the most popular tracks, the latter breaking into the top 10 in 1967.

Burdon dedicated the album to George Harrison of the Beatles, whose espousal of Hindu philosophy following a visit to India the previous year Burdon cited as an inspiration. Burdon was also a fan and friend of Jimi Hendrix and wrote the fifth track as an answer song to Hendrix's "Are You Experienced", which was still unreleased at the time the "answer" was recorded. (Hendrix recorded the track Are You Experienced on 4 April 1967, which puts doubt on the recording date given here as "over a two week period in March 1967" for Winds Of Change)

Reception

In their retrospective review, AllMusic described Winds of Change as the band's first real psychedelic rock album. They praised the closing track "It's All Meat" and the hard-rocking cover of "Paint It, Black" as rare examples of psychedelic rock songs by the Animals that are strong and convincing.

Track listing
All songs written by Eric Burdon, Vic Briggs, John Weider, Barry Jenkins, Danny McCulloch, except where noted.

Side one
 "Winds of Change" (3:59)
 "Poem by the Sea" (2:15)
 "Paint It Black" (Mick Jagger, Keith Richards) (5:57)
 "The Black Plague" (5:58)
 "Yes I Am Experienced" (3:38)

Side two
 "San Franciscan Nights" (3:18)
 "Man—Woman" (5:29)
 "Hotel Hell" (4:46)
 "Good Times" (2:58)
 "Anything" (3:19)
 "It's All Meat" (2:01)

Bonus tracks added on 2003 Repertoire Records reissue
 "When I Was Young" (UK Single A-Side) (2:59)
 "A Girl Named Sandoz" (UK Single B-Side) (Eric Burdon, John Weider) (3:05)
 "Good Times" (Single Version/UK Single A-Side) (2:58)
 "Ain't That So" (UK Single B-Side) (3:27)
 "San Franciscan Nights" (Single Version) (3:19)
 "Gratefully Dead" (UK Single B-Side) (3:59)

Personnel
Eric Burdon & the Animals
 Eric Burdon - vocals 
 Vic Briggs - guitar, piano, arrangements 
 John Weider - guitar, violin 
 Danny McCulloch - bass
 Barry Jenkins - drums 

Additional personnel
 Keith Olsen - "stepped in on some tracks to deputise on bass after Danny McCulloch broke his wrist"

References

1967 albums
The Animals albums
Albums produced by Tom Wilson (record producer)
MGM Records albums